Echiuridae is a family of spoon worms in the suborder Echiurida. It is a monotypic family, the only genus being Echiurus. These worms burrow into soft sediment on the seabed.

Species 
The World Register of Marine Species recognises the following species in the genus:-

 Echiurus abyssalis Skorikow, 1906
 Echiurus antarcticus Spengel, 1912
 Echiurus echiurus (Pallas, 1766)
 Echiurus sitchaensis Brandt, 1835

References

Echiurans